Elmer Calvin "Hank" Patterson (October 9, 1888 – August 23, 1975) was an American actor and musician. He is known foremost for playing two recurring characters on three television series:   the stableman Hank Miller on Gunsmoke and farmer Fred Ziffel on both Petticoat Junction and Green Acres.

Early life
Patterson was born in Springville, Alabama, one of seven children of Green Davis Patterson, an insurance agent, and Mary Isabell "Mollie" Newton Patterson. By the 1890s his family had moved to Taylor, Texas, where he spent most of his boyhood and attended school through 8th grade. In 1917 he registered for a World War I draft card in Lubbock County, Texas.

Patterson had intended to be a serious pianist, but he instead became a vaudeville piano player. By the end of the 1920s he moved to California. He entered the movie business as an actor during the 1930s. His earliest identified screen work was an uncredited appearance in the Roy Rogers' Western film The Arizona Kid (1939).

Movies and TV
Patterson found plenty of movie work, mainly playing cantankerous types as well as blacksmiths, hotel clerks, farmers, shopkeepers and other townsmen, usually bit roles and character parts in Republic Pictures westerns, and then in popular TV westerns such as The Cisco Kid, The Adventures of Kit Carson, The Lone Ranger, and Annie Oakley. He also had small cameo appearances in a number of sci-fi movies by Bert I. Gordon: Beginning of the End, The Amazing Colossal Man, Attack of the Puppet People, and Earth vs. The Spider.

Patterson played recurring or different roles in adult/family TV westerns, including the role of Hank Miller in 33 episodes of Gunsmoke from 1962 through 1973, on Have Gun-Will Travel (eleven episodes), Death Valley Days (nine episodes), Tales of Wells Fargo (seven episodes),Maverick (four episodes), Cheyenne (four episodes), Wagon Train (three episodes), Daniel Boone (three episodes), The Virginian (two episodes), The Rifleman, Bonanza, and in episodes of Lawman, Bat Masterson (sometimes in a recurring role as former Confederate Soldier Soda Smith), The Restless Gun, and many others.  In 1959 Patterson appeared as a sodbuster in an uncredited role on Lawman ("The Young Toughs").

He made additional TV appearances, including in three episodes of The Twilight Zone as well as Perry Mason, Burke's Law, The Untouchables, Judd for the Defense, My Three Sons, and in later years The Mod Squad and Love, American Style and Highway Patrol.

Green Acres
In 1963 Patterson first appeared in what would become a recurring role as farmer Fred Ziffel on the popular CBS rural comedy Petticoat Junction. In 1965 CBS debuted another rural comedy, Green Acres. Both series were set in the mythical farming community of Hooterville, with characters from Petticoat Junction often also appearing in Green Acres, including Patterson's Fred Ziffel character. It was on the popular, irreverent Green Acres that Patterson earned his greatest fame. In 1965 and 1966—two of the years in which the two series ran concurrently—Patterson frequently appeared in both shows in the same week in prime time.

The association of Patterson's character with the popular character Arnold, the pet pig whom Fred and his wife Doris treated as a son, ensured Patterson a place in TV history. Arnold attended school, watched TV and was a talented artist, piano player, and actor. He even "talked" (snorted, grunted and squealed) in a language that everyone in Hooterville seemed to understand except Oliver Wendell Douglas (Green Acres co-star Eddie Albert).

According to westernclippings.com "Characters and Heavies" by Boyd Magers, "Ironically, by the time Patterson was doing 'Green Acres' he was in his late 70s and almost completely deaf, but the producers loved his portrayal so much they worked around his hearing impairment by having the dialogue coach lying on the floor out-of-shot tapping Hank's leg with a yardstick as a cue to speak his line."

Personal life
Hank Patterson was married to Daisy Marguerite (Sheeler) Patterson, a Kentucky native four years younger than Hank whose parents were both of German ancestry. They are listed together in the U.S. Census for both 1930 and 1940 as residing in Los Angeles. In the 1940 census, Hank's occupation is listed as "Actor, Motion Picture Studio & Stage."

Patterson's great-grandfather, James Pearson, was an original settler of St. Clair County, Alabama, as was his mother's great-grandfather, Thomas Newton. His great-grandfather, Henry S. Patterson, moved to Blount County, Alabama, around 1857 from Murray County, Georgia. Between 1894 and 1897, the family left Alabama to live in Texas.

Hank Patterson died at age 86 on August 23, 1975 of bronchial pneumonia. He is buried in Forest Lawn Memorial Park in Hollywood.  Daisy died, also at age 86, on February 2, 1979.

Patterson's great-niece is actress Téa Leoni.

Selected filmography

The Arizona Kid (1939) - Townsman (uncredited)
Sabotage (1939) - Minor Role (uncredited)
The Covered Trailer (1939) - Townsman (uncredited)
Three Faces West (1940) - Pool Player (uncredited)
Abilene Town (1946) - Doug Neil
The Scarlet Horseman (1946) - Sen. Masters (uncredited)
I Ring Doorbells (1946) - Mr. Bradley
The El Paso Kid (1946) - Jeff Winters
Conquest of Cheyenne (1946) - Rancher (uncredited)
Wild Beauty (1946) - Ed (uncredited)
Santa Fe Uprising (1946) - Deputy Jake
Gallant Bess (1946) - Ranch Hand (uncredited)
Bells of San Angelo (1947) - Deaf Bus Passenger
Robin Hood of Texas (1947) - Taxicab Driver (uncredited)
Springtime in the Sierras (1947) - Old-Timer
Under Colorado Skies (1947) - Slim
The Tender Years (1948) - Zeke (uncredited)
Relentless (1948) - Bob Pliny (uncredited)
Oklahoma Badlands (1948) - Postmaster Fred
Panhandle (1948) - Old Timer (uncredited)
Night Time in Nevada (1948) - Dancing Tramp
The Denver Kid (1948) - Sergeant Cooper
The Plunderers (1948) - Stage Manager (uncredited)
Belle Starr's Daughter (1948) - Townsman (uncredited)
Red Canyon (1949) - Osborne (uncredited)
Outcasts of the Trail (1949) - Hank Barris - Station Agent (uncredited)
The James Brothers of Missouri (1949, Serial) - Duffy [Ch. 4] / Duffy [11]
The Cowboy and the Indians (1949) - Tom - Ranch Foreman
Tell It to the Judge (1949) - Sleigh Driver (uncredited)
Riders in the Sky (1949) - Luke - Stagecoach Driver
Perfect Strangers (1950) - Witness in Montage (uncredited)
Code of the Silver Sage (1950) - Sgt. Woods
No Sad Songs for Me (1950) - Night Construction Workman (uncredited)
Please Believe Me (1950) - Sam Smith (uncredited)
The Gunfighter (1950) - Jake (uncredited)
Desperadoes of the West (1950, Serial) - Hardrock Haggerty [Ch. 4, 5]
The Return of Jesse James (1950) - Clay County Marshal
Al Jennings of Oklahoma (1951) - Jeff (uncredited)
Silver City Bonanza (1951) - Postman
Don Daredevil Rides Again (1951, Serial) - Buck Bender
Indian Uprising (1952) - Jake Wilson (uncredited)
Rose of Cimarron (1952) - Hunter on Trail (uncredited)
California Conquest (1952) - Sam Lawrence (uncredited)
Woman They Almost Lynched (1953) - Townsman (uncredited)
Canadian Mounties vs. Atomic Invaders (1953, Serial) - Jed Larson [Ch.2-5]
Jack Slade (1953) - Old Tom (uncredited)
Ride Clear of Diablo (1954) - Wagon Driver (uncredited)
Southwest Passage (1954) - Barstow (uncredited)
Many Rivers to Cross (1955) - Second Innkeeper (uncredited)
Murder Is My Beat (1955) - Medical Examiner (uncredited)
Tarantula! (1955) - Josh
Last of the Desperados (1955) - Hank - Wagon Driver (uncredited)
The Great Locomotive Chase (1956) - Turner - Friendly Jailer (uncredited)
The Lone Ranger (1956) - Old Man Kimberley (uncredited)
The First Traveling Saleslady (1956) - First Cowhand in Courtroom (uncredited)
Strange Intruder (1956) - Knife Sharpener (uncredited)
Julie (1956) - Ellis
The Storm Rider (1957) - Tom Milstead
Beginning of the End (1957) - Dave
God Is My Partner (1957) - John Biddle (uncredited)
Man of a Thousand Faces (1957) - Scotty, Stage Door Man (uncredited)
Gunsight Ridge (1957) - George Clark (uncredited)
The Amazing Colossal Man (1957) - Henry
Escape from Red Rock (1957) - Sheriff Grover
Day of the Badman (1958) - George Foley (uncredited)
Attack of the Puppet People (1958) - Janitor
The Restless Gun (1958) - as Jonah in Episode "A Pressing Engagement"
The Restless Gun (1958) - as Milt in Episode "Sheriff Billy"
Tombstone Territory (1058) - Episode "Desert Survival"
Terror in a Texas Town (1958) - Brady (uncredited)
Earth vs. the Spider (1958) - Hugo the Janitor
The Saga of Hemp Brown (1958) - Gil Henry (uncredited)
The Decks Ran Red (1958) - Mr. Moody
Monster on the Campus (1958) - Townsend - Night Watchman (uncredited)
Tales of Wells Fargo (1959 episode Lola Montez) - Larson 
No Name on the Bullet (1959) - Ed - Chess Player (uncredited)
Lone Texan (1959) - Jack Stone (uncredited)
Gunmen from Laredo (1959) - Stableman (uncredited)
Gunfighters of Abilene (1960) - Andy Ferris (uncredited)
The Absent Minded Professor (1961) - Fisherman Spectator (uncredited)
Tammy Tell Me True (1961) - Rural Character (uncredited)
Straightaway (1961 episode "The Tin Caesar") – Parker
The Virginian (1964 episode "Smile of a Dragon") - Old Man  
A Covenant with Death (1967) - Old Man (uncredited)

Selected Television

References

External links

1888 births
1975 deaths
People from Springville, Alabama
American male television actors
American male pianists
Vaudeville performers
American male film actors
Burials at Forest Lawn Memorial Park (Hollywood Hills)
20th-century American male actors
Male actors from Alabama
Western (genre) television actors
Male Western (genre) film actors
20th-century American male musicians